In the 2007–08 season Panathinaikos played for 49th consecutive time in Greece's top division, Super League. They also competed in UEFA Cup and Greek Cup. Season started with José Peseiro as team manager. In summer of 2007 many players left the club including Igor Bišćan and Víctor Sánchez who hadn't fulfilled the expectations of Panathinaikos' fans with their performance. On the other end the return of Giorgos Karagounis after four years pulled the spotlight and considered one of the most important signings of the 2007 summer transfer window. Panathinaikos also signed Brazilian midfielder Marcelo Mattos from Corinthians, Dame N'Doye from Academica, Josu Sarriegi from Athletic Bilbao and some other players to help the team win its first championship in four years and celebrate the club's centesimal anniversary in the most appropriate way.

The championship began with Panathinaikos collecting seven points in the first three matchdays, having already played two derbies against Olympiacos (0–0) and PAOK (2–0).

Squad
As of 24 February 2008.

Squad changes for the 2007–08 season

In:

Out:

Out on loan:

Club

The management

Other information

Competitions

Super League Greece

Regular season

League table

Results summary

Results by round

Matches

UEFA play-offs

League table

Results summary

Results by round

Matches

Greek Cup

Panathinaikos entered the Greek Cup at the Round of 32.

Matches

UEFA Cup

First round

Group B

Knockout stage

Round of 32

Team kit

2007

|
|
|

2008

|
|
|
|

References

External links
 Panathinaikos FC official website

2007-08
Greek football clubs 2007–08 season